Jake Delaney (born 14 May 1997, in Sydney) is an Australian tennis player. Delaney won the 2015 Australian Open – Boys' doubles title with fellow Australian Marc Polmans, defeating Hubert Hurkacz and Alex Molčan in the final, 0–6, 6–2, [10–8].

Future and Challenger finals

Singles: 0 (0–0)

Doubles 5 (2–3)

Junior Grand Slam finals

Doubles: 1 (1–0)

External links 
 
 

1997 births
Living people
Australian male tennis players
Tennis players from Sydney
Australian Open (tennis) junior champions
Grand Slam (tennis) champions in boys' doubles
20th-century Australian people
21st-century Australian people